Kelly McEvers is an American journalist. McEvers is host of NPR's "Embedded" podcast. She was a co-host of  NPR's flagship newsmagazine All Things Considered until February 2018 . Before this she was a foreign correspondent for NPR, in which she covered momentous international events including the withdrawal of American troops from Iraq, Middle East uprisings associated with the Arab Spring, and the Syrian civil war.

Career
McEvers graduated from Lincoln Community High School in 1988. McEvers began her career as a reporter for the Chicago Tribune in 1997. She went on to cover Cambodia for the BBC in 1999–2000, then Indonesia, Malaysia and Singapore after 9/11 as an independent reporter. During the next several years, she continued to work as a freelance journalist in other areas of the world. McEvers covered the former Soviet Union from 2004 to 2006 for PRI's The World, in the course of which she was detained by Russian security forces.

From 2007 to 2009, she helped produce the award-winning series "Working" for the radio program Marketplace, filing several stories on topics ranging from sex workers in Azerbaijan to bankers in Dubai.

McEvers has covered the Middle East as an independent journalist and for NPR, from Saudi Arabia to Iraq in 2010, then at various locations in 2011 during the Arab Spring. She moved to Beirut in 2012. In 2013, she made a radio documentary about her time as a war correspondent called Diary of a Bad Year.

On September 21, 2015, McEvers joined NPR's All Things Considered as a co-host. In 2016, she became the host of NPR podcast Embedded.

McEvers has also written for the Christian Science Monitor, New York Times Magazine, Esquire, Foreign Policy. The New Republic, Slate, The Washington Monthly, and the San Francisco Chronicle.

She was a fellow at the International Center for Journalists.

Personal life
McEvers was born in Lincoln, Illinois. She has a B.A. from the University of Illinois Urbana-Champaign, and an M.S. in journalism from Northwestern University.

She is married to Nathan Deuel, who is also a reporter and writer, and they have one daughter.

References

External links
Kelly McEvers on Twitter

1970 births
Living people
American women journalists
American women war correspondents
University of Illinois Urbana-Champaign alumni
People from Lincoln, Illinois
Journalists from Illinois
21st-century American journalists
NPR personalities
21st-century American women